Kletsky District is an administrative district (raion), one of the thirty-three in Volgograd Oblast, Russia. Municipally, it is incorporated as Kletsky Municipal District. It is located in the west of the oblast. Its administrative center is the rural locality (a stanitsa) of Kletskaya. Population:  19,541 (2002 Census);  The population of Kletskaya accounts for 29.8% of the district's total population.

References

Notes

Sources

Districts of Volgograd Oblast